Aleksandar Džombić (born 15 April 1968) is a Bosnian Serb politician who served as the 10th Prime Minister of Republika Srpska from 29 December 2010 until 12 March 2013. 

He has also served as Minister of Finance of Republika Srpska from 30 November 2006 to 29 December 2010.

On the 17th January 2022 the District Court in Banja Luka confirmed the indictment for abuse of official position and authority against Džombić. The indictment was filed by the Republic Public Prosecutor's Office of the RS,  Special Department for the Suppression of Corruption, Organised and Serious Forms of Economic Crime and as it announced in early January 2022, DŽombić is charged with illegal granting of a loan from the Investment and Development Bank of the RS to the company "Energolinija" d.o.o. Zvornik in 2012 in the amount of 19,400,000 BAM (close to 10 million euros).

If convicted, DŽombić faces up to 15 years in prison.

DŽombić is currently the Managing Partner for Grant Thornton in Bosnia and Herzegovina.

On the 15th of March 2023, Aleksandar Džombić and the auditing work of one of the world’s biggest accounting firms, Grant Thornton, was sharply criticised by the Parliament in Banjaluka, Bosnia and Herzegovina.

References

1968 births
Living people
People from Čelinac
Serbs of Bosnia and Herzegovina
Prime ministers of Republika Srpska